Jannie du Toit (born 18 February 1970) is a South African wrestler. He competed in the men's freestyle 76 kg at the 2000 Summer Olympics.

References

External links
 

1970 births
Living people
South African male sport wrestlers
Olympic wrestlers of South Africa
Wrestlers at the 2000 Summer Olympics
Place of birth missing (living people)